Rociletinib is a medication developed to treat non-small cell lung carcinomas with a specific mutation. It is a third-generation epidermal growth factor receptor tyrosine kinase inhibitor. It was being developed by Clovis Oncology as a potential treatment for non-small-cell lung cancer. In May 2016, development of rociletinib was halted, along with its associated clinical trials, and Clovis Oncology withdrew its marketing authorisation application from the European Medicines Agency.

References 

Acrylamides
Experimental cancer drugs
Trifluoromethyl compounds
Receptor tyrosine kinase inhibitors
Abandoned drugs